Heron Bay may refer to:

 Heron Bay, Alabama, unincorporated community in Mobile County
 Heron Bay, Georgia, census-designated place in Henry and Spalding Counties
 Heron Bay, New Brunswick, a town established in 2023

 Heron Bay Community, Parkland, Florida a home community located 1 mile away from Marjory Stoneman Douglas High School. Located on the east side of the Florida everglades